James Bush (October 4, 1907 – April 9, 1987) was an American actor from the 1930s until the early 1950s. He appeared in more than 100 television shows and films, more than 80 of them being feature films.

Early years
The son of an actress, Bush moved to California with his mother and studied in a theatrical school and graduated from Los Angeles High School.

Stage
Bush first appeared on stage at age four. When he finished high school he began acting with the Morosco stock theater company. He also acted at the Pasadena Playhouse for four seasons, spent one season in St. Louis, and performed with the Henry Duffy Players at the Hollywood Playhouse.

Film
As a child, Bush appeared in some Paramount films that starred Mary Pickford.

While the Internet Movie Database has him appearing as a child actor in 1917's Jack and the Beanstalk, the American Film Institute has his first film role as Bent Weymer in 1932's Wild Horse Mesa, directed by Henry Hathaway, which was a featured part. During his career, Bush appeared in more than 80 feature films.

Although he appeared in many films in small, un-credited roles, he also appeared in featured roles in many notable films, including: as the adult Andrew Horn in The Great Jasper (1933); as Bill Radford in the 1933 drama, One Man's Journey; as Dick in the romantic comedy Young and Beautiful (1934); as Byron Coates/John Meseraux in the 1935 mystery, A Shot in the Dark; as Orin Tallant in the 1935 western, The Arizonian; as Arthur Pennyward in The Lady in Scarlet (1935); as Don Adams in the 1937 war film, I Cover the War!; as Johnny Eaton in the adventure film, Outlaws of the Orient (1937); as Henry Crusper in the 1939 comedy Joe and Ethel Turp Call on the President; as Ken Morgan in West of Cimarron, a Three Mesquiteers western (1940); as Joe Morgan in the Laurel and Hardy comedy, A-Haunting We Will Go; and as Hartman in another Laurel and Hardy film, The Big Noise (1944).

Occasionally, Bush would appear in a starring role: as Ralph Nelson in House of Danger (1934); and as Mark Twain in the 1937 western, Battle of Greed. Other notable films in which he appeared include: Ceiling Zero, a 1935 drama starring James Cagney and Pat O'Brien; M'liss (1936), starring Anne Shirley and John Beal; the 1937 drama, Internes Can't Take Money, starring Barbara Stanwyck and Joel McCrea; The Good Old Soak (1937), starring Wallace Beery; the 1937 mystery Night of Mystery; Sky Giant (1938), a drama starring Richard Dix, Chester Morris and Joan Fontaine; the W. C. Fields' comedy, You Can't Cheat an Honest Man; as one of the party guests at Twelve Oaks in the 1939 classic, Gone with the Wind; the 1940 fantasy Beyond Tomorrow; the Academy Award-winning war drama, Sergeant York, starring Gary Cooper; the 1943 Fritz Lang war drama, Hangmen Also Die!; the 1944 biopic about Woodrow Wilson, Wilson, starring Charles Coburn, Alexander Knox, Geraldine Fitzgerald, Thomas Mitchell and Sir Cedric Hardwicke; the 1947 docu-drama about the creation of the atom bomb, The Beginning or the End, starring Brian Donlevy, Robert Walker and Hume Cronyn; and the 1950 film noir, The Lawless, starring Macdonald Carey. Bush's last appearance in a feature film was in a small role in 1951's The Barefoot Mailman.

Bush also made infrequent appearances in film serials, such as Burn 'Em Up Barnes in 1934, and 1940's Mysterious Doctor Satan.Towards the end of his career, he made several guest appearances on television programs, including The Adventures of Kit Carson (1951), The Adventures of Wild Bill Hickok (1952), and Dragnet in 1953, which was also his last acting performance.

Death
Bush died on April 9, 1987, in Van Nuys, California.

Filmography

(Per AFI database)

Wild Horse Mesa  (1932) as Bent Weymer
Central Airport  (1933) as Amarillo Pilot (uncredited)
The Great Jasper  (1933) as Andrew Horn (adult)
One Man's Journey  (1933) as Bill Radford
Crimson Romance  (1934) as Fred von Bergen
Young and Beautiful  (1934) as Dick
House of Danger  (1934) as Ralph Nelson
Beggars in Ermine  (1934) as Lee Marley, Jim's Son
Eight Girls in a Boat  (1934) as Paul Lang
The Merry Frinks  (1934) as Oliver Gilfin
Burn 'Em Up Barnes  (1934, serial) as George Riley [Ch. 1] (uncredited)
Against the Law  (1934) as Bill Barrie
Harmony Lane  (1935) as Morrison Foster
A Shot in the Dark  (1935) as Byron Coates / John Meseraux
The Return of Peter Grimm  (1935) as James
The Arizonian  (1935) as Orin Tallant
Freckles  (1935) as Ralph Barton
Strangers All  (1935) as Lewis Carter
The Lady in Scarlet  (1935) as Arthur Pennyward
Confidential  (1935) as Lacey
The Glory Trail  (1936) as Lieutenant Dave Kirby
O'Malley of the Mounted  (1936) as Bud Hyland
M'Liss  (1936) as Jack Farlan
Ceiling Zero  (1936) as Buzz Gordon
Absolute Quiet  (1936) as Airport Radio Operator (uncredited)
Crashing Through Danger  (1936) as Eddie
Internes Can't Take Money  (1937) as Haines
Battle of Greed  (1937) as Mark Twain
I Cover the War!  (1937) as Don Adams
Night of Mystery  (1937) as Rex Greene
The Good Old Soak  (1937) as Tom Ogden
Outlaws of the Orient  (1937) as Johnny Eaton
Sky Giant  (1938) as Cadet Thompson
I Am the Law  (1938) as Law Student (uncredited)
Come On, Leathernecks!  (1938) as Dick Taylor
 Topa Topa (1938) as Jim Turner
You Can't Cheat an Honest Man  (1939) as Roger Bel-Goodie
Joe and Ethel Turp Call on the President  (1939) as Henry Crusper
They Asked for It  (1939) as Tucker Tyler
The Family Next Door  (1939) as Harold Warner
Andy Hardy Gets Spring Fever  (1939) as Bill Franklin (uncredited)
Beyond Tomorrow  (1940) as Jace Taylor
Appointment for Love  (1941) as Dr. Wade (uncredited)
A Girl, a Guy and a Gob  (1941) as Sailor Taking Address Book (uncredited)
West of Cimarron  (1941) as Dr. Ken Morgan
You're in the Army Now  (1941) as Lieutenant (uncredited)
Sergeant York  (1941) as Private (uncredited)
So Ends Our Night  (1941) as Herbert
A-Haunting We Will Go  (1942) as Joe Morgan
Captains of the Clouds  (1942) as Sergeant Pilot (uncredited)
Iceland  (1942) as Master Sergeant (uncredited)
Sundown Jim  (1942) as Ring Barr
Hangmen Also Die!  (1943) as Peacock
He Hired the Boss  (1943) as Clark
Hers to Hold  (1943) as Bomber Captain (uncredited)
Jitterbugs  (1943) as Henchman Jimmy O'Grady (uncredited)
King of the Cowboys  (1943) as Dave Mason
Spotlight Scandals  (1943) as Jerry
Bomber's Moon  (1943) as Radek - Czech Prisoner (scenes deleted)
Air Force  (1943) as Clark Field Control Officer (uncredited)
Can't Help Singing  (1944) as Cavalry Officer (uncredited)
Call of the Jungle  (1944) as Jim
Shine on Harvest Moon  (1944) as William R. Fowler (uncredited)
The Big Noise  (1944) as Hartman
Wilson  (1944) as Reporter (uncredited)
Because of Him  (1946) as Critic (uncredited)
They Made Me a Killer  (1946) as Frank Conley
The Beginning or the End  (1947) as Dr. Ernest O. Lawrence
Out of the Past  (1947) as Doorman (uncredited)
Homecoming  (1948) as Instructor (uncredited)
The Man from Colorado  (1948) as Cpl. Dixon (uncredited)
Race Street  (1948) as Male Nurse on Ward (uncredited)
Massacre River  (1949) as Eddie
Armored Car Robbery  (1950) as Control Tower Operator (uncredited)
Convicted  (1950) as Guard in Kitchen (uncredited)
The Killer That Stalked New York  (1950) as Hennick (uncredited)
The Lawless  (1950) as Anderson
The Barefoot Mailman  (1951) as Guard (uncredited)
Chain of Circumstance  (1951) as Office Help (uncredited)
Never Trust a Gambler  (1951) as Jim - State Trooper (uncredited)
Saddle Legion  (1951) as Gabe

References

External links

 

20th-century American male actors
1907 births
1987 deaths
American male child actors
American male film actors
American male stage actors